When present the cystic vein  drains the blood from the gall-bladder, and, accompanying the cystic duct, usually ends in the right branch of the portal vein. It is usually not present, and the blood drains via small veins in the gall-bladder bed directly to the parenchyma of the liver.

References

External links
 

Veins of the torso